Julia Chilicki (later Beasley; born August 1, 1971) is an American rower. She competed in the women's quadruple sculls event at the 1996 Summer Olympics.

References

External links
 

1971 births
Living people
American female rowers
Olympic rowers of the United States
Rowers at the 1996 Summer Olympics
People from Somers, Connecticut
Pan American Games medalists in rowing
Pan American Games bronze medalists for the United States
Rowers at the 1995 Pan American Games
21st-century American women